Matthew Barton may refer to:
 Matthew Barton  (Royal Navy officer) (c. 1715–1795), English naval officer
 Matthew Barton (tennis) (born 1991), Australian tennis player
 Matt Barton (politician), Georgia (US) politician
 Matt Barton (motorcycle racer) (born 1996), Australian motorcycle racer
Matthew Barton (sailor) (born 1995), British Windsurfer